Temple Christian School is a private Christian high school located in Lima, Ohio. Temple was founded in 1976 as a ministry of the Lima Baptist Temple. It is a K-12 traditional Christian school of 226 students.

Organization
Temple Christian School was founded in 1976 as a ministry of Lima Baptist Temple. Students come from a variety of different churches and denominations in the Lima, Ohio area, but are required to share many of the same core evangelical beliefs.

Mission statement
The mission at Temple Christian School is to glorify God by providing for students a Christ-centered education marked by excellence and grounded in Biblical truth.

Athletics
Temple Christian School provides a number of team sports for students to participate in.
 Fall - Soccer, Volleyball, Golf
 Winter - Basketball, Bowling, Cheerleading
 Spring - Baseball, Track

Sources

External links
 School Website

Christian schools in Ohio
High schools in Allen County, Ohio
Buildings and structures in Lima, Ohio
Private high schools in Ohio
Private middle schools in Ohio
Private elementary schools in Ohio
1976 establishments in Ohio